Émile Blessig (born 27 May 1947 in Saverne) was a member of the National Assembly of France.  He represented the 7th constituency of the Bas-Rhin department from 1998 to 2012 as a member of the Union for a Popular Movement.

References

1947 births
Living people
People from Saverne
Union for French Democracy politicians
Union for a Popular Movement politicians
The Social Right
Deputies of the 12th National Assembly of the French Fifth Republic
Deputies of the 13th National Assembly of the French Fifth Republic